Turk's cap lily is a common name for several plants and may refer to:

 Lilium martagon, a species native to a wide area from central Europe east to Mongolia and Korea
 Lilium michauxii, a species native to southeastern North America
 Lilium superbum, a species native to eastern and central regions of North America

See also
Turk's cap